KTIV (channel 4) is a television station in Sioux City, Iowa, United States, affiliated with NBC and The CW Plus. Owned by Gray Television, the station has studios on Signal Hill Drive in Sioux City, and its transmitter is located near Hinton, Iowa.

History
After overcoming some construction obstacles, including having to raise the microwave tower height twice to avoid interference with a tree which blocked the microwave signal, KTIV made its broadcasting debut on October 10, 1954. That first broadcast evening included four NBC shows: People Are Funny at 6 p.m.; The Liebman Spectacular from 6:30 to 8 p.m.; The Television Playhouse from 8 to 9 p.m.; and The Loretta Young Show from 9 to 9:30 p.m.

The station has always been an NBC affiliate, but it shared ABC programming with KVTV/KCAU-TV until September 2, 1967, when KCAU switched its primary affiliation to ABC. During the late 1950s, the station was also briefly affiliated with the NTA Film Network.

The station was originally owned by the Perkins family along with the Sioux City Journal and KSCJ radio. Perkins Brothers Company sold KTIV to Black Hawk Broadcasting, the owner of fellow NBC affiliate and former sister station KWWL-TV in Waterloo, in 1973. Black Hawk merged with Forward Communications in 1980, and sold KTIV and KWWL to AFLAC (then known by its full name, the American Family Life Assurance Company) that year. Quincy Newspapers bought KTIV from AFLAC in 1989.

In June 2011, KTIV's newscasts began to be broadcast in high definition. It was the second station in the Sioux City market (after KCAU-TV) to begin broadcasting news in HD, and the last station in the market to begin using a widescreen format for local news.

Former NBC News anchor Tom Brokaw and former KNBC/ABC News anchor Paul Moyer began their television careers at KTIV.

On February 1, 2021, Gray Television announced its intent to purchase Quincy Media for $925 million. The acquisition was completed on August 2, making KTIV sister to Gray stations in nearby markets, including NBC/ABC affiliates KDLT-TV and KSFY-TV in Sioux Falls and fellow NBC affiliate WOWT in Omaha. It also reunited KTIV with some former AFLAC sister stations, as AFLAC eventually merged its broadcasting unit into Raycom Media in 1997 and that company was purchased by Gray in 2019.

Notable former on-air staff
 Tom Brokaw – newscaster, weatherman, and staff announcer (later a special contributor to NBC News; retired)
 Paul Moyer (later at KNBC, now retired)
 Gene Sherman – sportscaster
 Terry Zahn – newscaster (later at WAVY-TV and WVEC, now deceased)

Technical information

Subchannels
The station's digital signal is multiplexed:

Analog-to-digital conversion
KTIV shut down its analog signal, over VHF channel 4, at 1:30 p.m. on February 17, 2009, which was the original date of the federally mandated transition from analog to digital television; it was later moved to June 12, 2009. The station's digital signal remained on its pre-transition UHF channel 41, using PSIP to display KTIV's virtual channel as 4 on digital television receivers.

Translator

KTIV was formerly rebroadcast over these translators:
 Neligh, Nebraska: K40HB, channel 40.
 O'Neill, Nebraska: K51CC, channel 51.

References

External links
 
 Siouxland CW Website

NBC network affiliates
MeTV affiliates
Court TV affiliates
Ion Television affiliates
Circle (TV network) affiliates
Gray Television
Television channels and stations established in 1954
TIV